The third season of Futurama began airing in 2001 and concluded after 22 episodes in 2002. The entire season is included within the Volume Three DVD box set, which was released on March 9, 2004.

The complete 22 episodes of the season have been released on a box set called Futurama: Volume Three, on DVD and VHS. It was first released in Region 2 on June 2, 2003, with releases in other regions following in 2003 and 2004 and is based in 3003 and 3004. The season was re-released as Futurama: Volume 3, with entirely different packaging to match the newer season releases on July 17, 2012.

Episodes

Critical reception

Reception
Andy Patrizio of IGN gave the season a positive review  giving it a 7.0.

Nielsen ratings
The season ranked 115th in the weekly ratings with an average viewership of 5.9 million viewers.

Home releases

References

Futurama lists
2001 American television seasons
2002 American television seasons
Futurama (season 3) episodes
Futurama seasons